Ramazan Emirhan Civelek (born 5 January 2000) is a Turkish professional footballer who plays as a rightback for TFF Second League club Adıyaman FK.

Professional career
On 14 July 2019, Civelek joined Kayserispor on a season-long loan from Galatasaray. Civelek made his professional debut for Kayserispor in a 6-2 Süper Lig loss to Trabzonspor on 28 December 2019.

References

External links
 
 

2000 births
People from Zonguldak Province
Living people
Turkish footballers
Turkey youth international footballers
Association football fullbacks
Galatasaray S.K. footballers
Kayserispor footballers
Sakaryaspor footballers
Akhisarspor footballers
Niğde Anadolu FK footballers
Süper Lig players
TFF Second League players